Grahanandan Singh (18 February 1926 in Lyallpur, British India – 7 December 2014 in New Delhi, India) was an Indian field hockey player who won two gold medals, at the 1948 and 1952 Summer Olympics. There is a documentary film on the team, 
https://www.thehindu.com/life-and-style/documentary-on-hockey-olympian-grahnandan-singh-explores-a-partition-era-friendship/article65153526.ece

External links
 
 profile

1926 births
2014 deaths
Field hockey players from Punjab, India
Olympic field hockey players of India
Field hockey players at the 1948 Summer Olympics
Field hockey players at the 1952 Summer Olympics
Indian male field hockey players
Olympic gold medalists for India
Field hockey players from Faisalabad
Olympic medalists in field hockey
Medalists at the 1948 Summer Olympics
Medalists at the 1952 Summer Olympics